The 1999 Thuringian state election was held on 12 September 1999 to elect the members of the 3rd Landtag of Thuringia. The incumbent government was a grand coalition of the Christian Democratic Union (CDU) and Social Democratic Party (SPD) led by Minister-President Bernhard Vogel. The CDU won an absolute majority in the election and formed government alone; Vogel continued as Minister-President.

Parties
The table below lists parties represented in the 2nd Landtag of Thuringia.

Election result

|-
! colspan="2" | Party
! Votes
! %
! +/-
! Seats 
! +/-
! Seats %
|-
| bgcolor=| 
| align=left | Christian Democratic Union (CDU)
| align=right| 592,474
| align=right| 51.0
| align=right| 8.4
| align=right| 49
| align=right| 7
| align=right| 55.7
|-
| bgcolor=| 
| align=left | Party of Democratic Socialism (PDS)
| align=right| 247,906
| align=right| 21.3
| align=right| 4.7
| align=right| 21
| align=right| 4
| align=right| 23.9
|-
| bgcolor=| 
| align=left | Social Democratic Party (SPD)
| align=right| 214,801
| align=right| 18.5
| align=right| 11.1
| align=right| 18
| align=right| 11
| align=right| 20.5
|-
! colspan=8|
|-
| bgcolor=| 
| align=left | German People's Union (DVU)
| align=right| 36,386
| align=right| 3.1
| align=right| 3.1
| align=right| 0
| align=right| ±0
| align=right| 0
|-
| bgcolor=| 
| align=left | Alliance 90/The Greens (Grüne)
| align=right| 21,617
| align=right| 1.9
| align=right| 2.6
| align=right| 0
| align=right| ±0
| align=right| 0
|-
| bgcolor=| 
| align=left | Free Democratic Party (FDP)
| align=right| 31,001
| align=right| 1.1
| align=right| 2.1
| align=right| 0
| align=right| ±0
| align=right| 0
|-
| bgcolor=|
| align=left | Others
| align=right| 34,996
| align=right| 3.0
| align=right| 
| align=right| 0
| align=right| ±0
| align=right| 0
|-
! align=right colspan=2| Total
! align=right| 1,161,181
! align=right| 100.0
! align=right| 
! align=right| 88
! align=right| ±0
! align=right| 
|-
! align=right colspan=2| Voter turnout
! align=right| 
! align=right| 59.9
! align=right| 14.9
! align=right| 
! align=right| 
! align=right| 
|}

Sources
 Landtagswahl 1999 in Thüringen - endgültiges Ergebnis

1999
1999 elections in Germany